The 7th ACTRA Awards were presented on March 22, 1978. The ceremony was hosted by Gordon Pinsent.

Winners and nominees

References

1978 in Canadian television
ACTRA
ACTRA Awards